The 61st Infantry Regiment is an infantry regiment of the United States Army traditionally associated with the 5th Infantry Division.

History
The regiment's campaign honors include Vietnam War. Where it took part in Operation Montana Mauler on the Khe Sanh plateau in 1969,
and the United States invasion of Panama in 1989.

The 1st Battalion of the 61st Infantry Regiment is one of the Basic Combat Training (BCT) units within the US Army. The 61st "Roadrunners" are located in Fort Jackson, South Carolina. There are six companies, Alpha "Gators", Bravo "Bulldogs", Charlie "Roughnecks", Delta "Dragons", Echo "War Eagles", and Foxtrot "Phantoms" with four platoons in each Company.  The 61st is a gender integrated BCT unit.

Distinctive unit insignia
 Description
A silver color metal and enamel device 1 3/32 inches (2.78 cm) in height overall consisting of a shield blazoned: Azure, a pale wavy Argent charged with a fusil Gules, on a canton embattled of the second a field gun of the third on a mount Vert.
Symbolism
This regiment was organized in June 1917 from the 7th Infantry and participated in World War I in the 5th Division, the insignia of which is carried on the shield. The wavy pale represents the Meuse River, the crossing of which near Dun in November 1918 was the outstanding operation of the regiment.
 Background
The distinctive unit insignia was approved on 10 Jun 1931.

Coat of arms

Blazon
 Shield- Azure, a pale wavy Argent charged with a fusil Gules. On a canton embattled of the second a field gun of the third on a mount Vert.
 Crest- On a wreath of the colors Argent and Azure a lion rampant Sable armed and langued Gules grasping in his dexter paw the shoulder sleeve insignia of the 5th Division Proper.
 Motto- THE BEST LEAD THE REST

Symbolism- This regiment was organized in June 1917 from the 7th Infantry and participated in World War I in the 5th Division, the insignia of which is carried on the shield and also the crest. The wavy pale represents the Meuse River, the crossing of which near Dun in November 1918 was the outstanding operation of the regiment. The lion of the crest is taken from the arms of Montmédy, the nearest place to Dun having a coat of arms.

Background- The coat of arms was originally approved on 9 Jun 1920. It was amended on 16 Jul 1920 to change the wording in the blazon of the shield. On 25 Oct 1965 the coat of arms was amended to add a motto.

References

061
United States Army regiments of World War I